Sir John Radcliffe  (died 1441), of Attleborough, was an English knight and administrator who served as Seneschal of Gascony, 2nd Baron of the  Court of Exchequer (Ireland), Joint Chief Butler of Ireland, Bailli of Evreux and Constable of Bordeaux. He represented Norfolk as a Member of Parliament in 1420 and 1427.

Life
Radcliffe was the younger son of James Radcliffe of Radcliffe, Lancashire and Joan Tempest. John spent his early years in the entourage of Thomas of Lancaster. He is described as Thomas's Secretary, and went with him to Ireland in 1401, when Thomas was appointed Lord Lieutenant of Ireland. He was appointed second Baron of the Irish Court of Exchequer in 1404. It is unclear if he had any legal qualifications: despite their senior judicial office, Irish Barons were not then invariably lawyers. He was appointed in April 1406, Joint Chief Butler of Ireland by Thomas.

John died in 1441 and was buried at Attleborough church, Norfolk, England.

Marriage and issue
Radcliffe married firstly, Cecilia, daughter of Thomas Mortimer and Mary Parke. The marriage brought him considerable wealth and an increase in his social standing. She was a maternal half-sister of Sir John Fastolf and mother of Sir Robert Harling. They are known to have had the following issue:
John Radcliffe
Thomas Radcliffe
Fynette Radcliffe
Roger Radcliffe
He married secondly, Catherine, daughter of Edward Burnell and Alice Le Strange, they are known to have had the following issue:
James Radcliffe
Robert Radcliffe
Alicia Radcliffe

References

Further reading
The History of Parliament: the House of Commons 1386-1421, ed. J.S. Roskell, L. Clark, C. Rawcliffe., 1993
Radcliffe, Sir John: Oxford Dictionary of National Biography

Year of birth unknown
1441 deaths
15th-century English people
Medieval English knights
Seneschals of Gascony
Members of Parliament for Norfolk
Knights of the Garter